Liu Xinquan (1916–1994) was a People's Liberation Army major general and Chinese diplomat. He was born in Da County, Sichuan Province (modern Dachuan District, Dazhou). He was Ambassador of China to the Soviet Union (1970–1976) and Albania (1976–1979).

References
黄峥, 《共产党员 (内部版)》 编辑部. 《在历史的档案里: 文革十年风云录》. 辽宁大学出版社. 1988年: 64页.
1916 births
1994 deaths
Ambassadors of China to the Soviet Union
Ambassadors of China to Albania
People's Liberation Army generals from Sichuan
Vice-ministers of the Ministry of Foreign Affairs of the People's Republic of China
People from Dazhou